Lectionary 91, designated by siglum ℓ 91 (in the Gregory-Aland numbering), is a Greek manuscript of the New Testament, on vellum leaves. Palaeographically it has been assigned to the 14th century.

Description 

The codex contains lessons from the Gospels of John, Matthew, Luke lectionary (Evangelistarium) with some lacunae. It is written in Greek minuscule letters, on 322 parchment leaves. The writing is in 2 columns per page, 23 lines per page. 
It contains subscriptions at the end.

History 

The manuscript was written in Cyprus, by monk Leontius. 
It once belonged to Colbert's (as were ℓ 87, ℓ 88, ℓ 89, ℓ 90, ℓ 99, ℓ 100, ℓ 101).

It was partially examined and described by Bernard de Montfaucon, Scholz, and Paulin Martin. C. R. Gregory saw it in 1885.

The manuscript is not cited in the critical editions of the Greek New Testament (UBS3).

Currently the codex is located in the Bibliothèque nationale de France (Gr. 318) in Paris.

See also 

 List of New Testament lectionaries
 Biblical manuscript
 Textual criticism

References

Bibliography 

 Bernard de Montfaucon, Palaeographia Graeca (Paris 1708), p. 89. 

Greek New Testament lectionaries
14th-century biblical manuscripts
Bibliothèque nationale de France collections